Apt Records was a sub-label from ABC-Paramount Records.  The label was started in 1958 and released only singles until it was shelved in 1966.  ABC briefly reactivated Apt twice, in 1969 and 1972, and also used the Apt name on a line of budget-priced 8-track and cassette tapes in 1970. The name was derived from ABC-Paramount's parent company, American Broadcasting-Paramount Theatres.

Label variants
1958-1966: Black label with multi-color logo at top 
1965: Black and white label with new logo at left (in conjunction with the above label)
1969-1972: Yellow label with orange APT logo and "abc RECORDS" logo at top

See also 
 List of record labels

References

External links
 Singles discography

Defunct record labels of the United States
Record labels